"I Don't Wanna Lose At Love" is the second single to be released from Tanita Tikaram's sixth studio album The Cappuccino Songs.

Background

"I Don't Wanna Lose at Love" has a distinctive string intro, which is looped throughout the song, that is sampled from Finnish folk-rock band Värttinä's 1992 song "Seelinnikoi". The group received a credit as co-writers of the song.

Released as the second single of Tikaram's album The Cappuccino Songs, the single mix differs from the album version, and was given a poppier sound by Stephen Lironi. The song was given additional remixes by noted remixers of Indian ascent Asian Dub Foundation and Talvin Singh.

The single was released as a two-part CD in the UK. It peaked at #73 there, and to date it's Tikaram's last single to chart in that country.

Releases
UK CD single 1
"I Don't Wanna Lose At Love" (Radio Version) — 3:56
"I Don't Wanna Lose At Love" (Love Loss Asian Dub Foundation Remix) — 4:28
"In Your Time" — 3:46

UK CD single 2
"I Don't Wanna Lose At Love" (Radio Version) — 3:56
"I Don't Wanna Lose At Love" (XT Talvin Singh Mix) — 7:18
"Only One Boy In The Crowd" - 3:38

Charts 

1998 singles
Tanita Tikaram songs
Songs written by Marco Sabiu
1998 songs